William Nuttall (7 December 1920 – 4 March 1963) was an English footballer who played in the Football League for Barrow and Preston North End. He died in Preston in 1963.

References

External links
 

1920 births
1963 deaths
English footballers
English Football League players
Preston North End F.C. players
Barrow A.F.C. players
Association football defenders